"Midnight Sun" is a song recorded by the Romanian female singer Elena Gheorghe. The song was recorded in summer 2010 and premiered on November 15, 2010, on Gheorghe's official YouTube channel. It was released under Cat Music exclusively in Romania. The song has more house influences than the previous number-one hit "Disco Romancing". It was sent to the mainstream radio stations in late November and it is promoted as the second single taken from Gheorghe's album entitled Disco Romancing. Lyrically, the song describes the shiver a millionaire wannabe guy gets when he sees Elena dancing. The song had its official radio premiere on the Romanian National Day, at radio ZU, though it premiered on Kiss FM a week earlier. Elena performed "Midnight Sun" live, on December 31, during a New Year special show, held by Pro TV. The music video was already shot in Bucharest and it was released via YouTube on May 13, 2011. The video features many special effects as well as the track listing for Gheorghe's upcoming album. The song peaked at number-one the Radio Top 50 and charted within the top ten in two other Romanian charts. In the official Romanian Top 100 it peaked at number-ten, thus making it Elena's fifth song to enter the top ten in Romania, after "Soarele meu", "Vocea ta", "The Balkan Girls" and "Disco Romancing". The song was performed at many dates throughout Romania.

Commercial reception 
The song received a total of over 10,000,000 views in more than ten different channels on YouTube, as of April 1, 2011. Beginning with the release's date, "Midnight Sun" have been excessively downloaded (mostly illegally); It was reported that the song has sold over 5,000 units of paid downloads in Romania exclusively.

In the airplay charts, the song fared much better. In the official Romanian Top 100 it began at number seventy-five, but in less than a month it reached its peak of number sixteen. The song reached the top ten on the week-ending issue of May 29, 2011 when it peaked at number-ten. In the Radio Only Chart "Midnight Sun" debuted inside the top forty and peaked at number-ten in its thirteenth week within the chart. The Media Forest website showed that Elena's track began at number ten (the lowest position) within the National Top 10, a chart measuring only the airplays given to Romanian artists, in the week-ending issue of March 27, 2011. That week, it counted a number of 89 airings. The next week it rose to number-eight, with a total of 111 airings. In its third week in the chart it jumped 3 positions (8-5), showing a 30% increase in the number of airings, gathering a total of 154 airings. The next week the song rose another position, to number-four in the National Chart; Even though, it lost 22% in airing frequency, with a total of 146 airplays that week On April 24, the song reached the top spot in that chart, with a total of 188 plays, which means a 28% increase. In the following weeks, the song registered a loss in number of radio airing, but because the music video was sent to the TV stations the song ascended a few positions week by week.  As of April 12, "Midnight Sun" has been played on: Kiss FM, Radio ZU, Pro FM and Radio 21, the top mainstream Radio stations in Romania and on all the special music channels.
As of July 19, the song exited all the MediaForest top-ten charts and the top twenty of the Romanian Top 100, losing 55% from the number of radio airings. As of September 18, 2011, "Sun" fell off the Romanian Top fifty.

Overseas, the song peaked at number twenty-one in the Dutch Top 100 while it fared well better within the Dutch Top 40 where it peaked at number-nine for several weeks, becoming Elena's first top-ten there. It also did well at the year-end charts. The song has also entered the Slovakian Airplay Chart. It received airplay in Czech Republic, Poland and Hungary.

In the United States, the single was released by Ultra Records in September 2011.

Music video

Development 
The music video for "Midnight Sun" was confirmed in early 2011, as the single was sent to the mainstream radio stations. Gheorghe confirmed that a filming for the video would take place in March–April on Twitter and Facebook. The music video was shot on April 11 in the Archeology Museum of Bucharest in a full day. The director was Dragoş Buliga, the same as for "The Balkan Girls" and "Disco Romancing". Cătălin Enache was the stylist whilst Dana Argeşean the make-up artist. For the video, Gheorghe had to lose 5 kilograms in weight in less than a week and to tattoo her body with characters from Alice in Wonderland. She had also had to go brunette, as confirmed on her Facebook wall. In the 20-hour shooting, Gheorghe wore a pirate costume, a Turkish hat and a black leotard, amongst others. She posted a few photos of her in the outfits below as well as a picture of her bathing in a giant pot of 400 liters of strawberry tea. The video was released on May 14, 2011, online, via YouTube and Facebook. It features various dance scenes and some special effects.

Elena said of the video, "It was fun but also hard. This time I have involved ways more than in the previous video storylines and I can honestly say it is a music video that I enjoy. I hope you're gonna like it as much as I do!"

Synopsis 
The video opens with Elena wearing a head-to-toe white dress which allows us to see one of her breasts, covered by an intense black plastic stiletto. She also wears a pair of black gloves and a black French bob wig. This two non-colors simbolyze the contrast between good and bad. She seems to be on the cover of an album with barcode 8697-38188-2. Then we are switched to a tub scene, where Elena is laying in a pot of cherry tea wearing a red mini skirt. The title indicates "Tea Time" and it is shown that the "Elena-tea" costs only $2,90. A bag tea is also shown. Then, Elena is on the cover of Heroes magazine, headlining "DANGER GIRL!" with a cover story title "EXCLUSIVE: Elena Gheorghe Interview". Up next, the screen is divided into 5, with Elena is the center and four dancers shown in sepia around her. On the left side of the screen we can see "MIDNIGHT SUN Starring Elena. A SUPER GIRL". The word "Diva" appears behind Elena. Afterwards, she appears with a more Latino style as lyrics from the song are shown in boldface. We are then introduced with the track listing of her upcoming album – "Midnight Sun".

Elena then is on the cover of a magazine named after her. This scene is followed by a dance scene alongside her four back up dancers. They strip off and Elena remains in an orange sweater and a green bra wearing 5 inches high-heels. She has a pirate look while her dancer are wearing policemen caps. She has got a monocle. She is then featured in a magazine along with Nicki Minaj. The dance scenes continue as Elena gets out of the tea spot and starts playing with the Tea bag. If all these swagger scenes happen upstairs, in the basement takes place a "Vintage times" themed party. There, a man is playing a bass fiddle and Elena wears a Turkish turban executing oriental moves. The video ends with Elena bathing in the tea pot.

The video received mixed reviews, with many critics saying that "This video comes to show how cheap a female star can be nowadays, criticizing the fact that Elena is sold with only $2.90 as the "Tea girl".

Promotion 
Elena Gheorghe began the promotion for "Midnight Sun" in late November 2010. She performed the song live at Kiss FM, the most known mainstream radio station in Romania. On December 1, on the National Day of Romania Elena premiered officially the song at Radio ZU, after singing a couple of Romanian fellow songs ("Fotoliul din odaie" and "Drumurile noastre"). In December, Elena kept touring in Romania. On the New Year's Eve (December 31, 2010 – January 1, 2011) Elena was one of the special guests during the Star Maraton special program held by Pro TV. There she performed "Midnight Sun" in a medley with her previous superhit "Disco Romancing". During the performance, she wore a simple pink dress with eight-inches heels. The song was also performed at the morning show "Neatza cu Răzvan şi Dani" along with her songs "Waiting" and "I'm On Fire" as well as a feature with Dony ("Hot Girls"). Later, Gheorghe went on a concert tour through Romania. One of the most notable concerts where "Midnight Sun" was headlining was the one in The Heaven Club, Timișoara. The Heaven Club is a notorious and very expansive club; The performance was recorded.
Elena performed "Midnight Sun" on May 19 on "Neatza", Antena 1 and on May 20 on "Acces Direct", the same TV channel. It was then performed on "PoveŞiri de noapte" of Acasă women television, on "LOL" with Greg and Onuc (MTV Romania) and on the "Cronica Cârcotaşilor" season-finale on May 25, on Prima TV.
Elena will continue her promo tour and it is expected to hit foreign countries in the summer. She confirmed her presence on the Romanian seaside during July and August, in resorts such as Mamaia, Constanţa or Mangalia. She is scheduled to perform during the Mamaia music festival and on the Callatis Festival.

Chart positions

Weekly charts

Year-end charts

References 

2010 songs
2011 singles
Elena Gheorghe songs
Ultra Music singles
Electro swing songs
Songs written by Ovi Bistriceanu